Following is a list of senators of Yvelines, people who have represented the department of Yvelines in the Senate of France.
The department was created in 1978 as part of a reorganization of the former departments of Seine and Seine-et-Oise.

Fifth Republic 
Senators for Yvelines under the French Fifth Republic were:

References

Sources

 
Lists of members of the Senate (France) by department